The 1934–35 season was Union Sportive Musulmane Blidéenne's 2nd season in existence. The club played in the Third Division for the 2nd season French colonial era, as well as the North African Cup.

Pre-season

Squad
1st team: Aoudiani, Marghella, Mahmoud Boukhdimi, Chelha, Houari, Said, Bouchama, Hatem, Bouzar, Zatout
reserve team : Mohamed Moréna, Hamou, Zouraghi, Mellal, Nacer, Hadef, Nemet, Ouchat, Laid, Djelloul

Competitions

Overview

League table

Results

Third Division

Matches

Play-off

Second Place

North African Cup

References

External links
La Presse libre (Alger)
L'Indépendant
L'Echo d'Alger
Le Tell

USM Blida seasons
Algerian football clubs 1934–35 season